Lieutenant Colonel Sir Derek William George Keppel  (7 April 1863 – 26 April 1944) was a member of the British Royal Household.

Early life
Keppel was a son of the 7th Earl of Albemarle and was educated at Charterhouse School. He joined the army and rose to the rank of Lieutenant-Colonel in The Prince of Wales' Own Civil Service Rifles and served in India.

Courtier
Keppel was appointed an equerry to the Duke of York in 1893, and was reappointed as such when the latter became Prince of Wales in 1901. On the Prince's accession as King George V in 1910, Keppel was appointed Deputy Master of the Household and in 1912 promoted to Master of the Household, serving in this post until the King's death in 1936. He continued as the only Master of the Household under King Edward VIII's short reign, and on the accession of King George VI he returned to being an equerry until his own death in 1944.

Family
On 20 June 1898, he married Bridget Louisa Harbord, (later known as Lady Keppel), a daughter of the 5th Baron Suffield, and they had three daughters.

Honours

British decorations
CMG : Companion of the Order of St Michael and St George - 26 November 1901 - after accompanying the Prince of Wales on his 1901 Commonwealth tour
CIE : Commander of the Order of the Indian Empire
KCB : Knight Commander of the Order of the Bath
GCVO: Knight Grand Cross of the Royal Victorian Order

Foreign decorations
: Order of the White Lion

References

External links
 Old photograph

Knights Commander of the Order of the Bath
Companions of the Order of St Michael and St George
Companions of the Order of the Indian Empire
Knights Grand Cross of the Royal Victorian Order
People educated at Charterhouse School
London Regiment officers
King's Royal Rifle Corps officers
Younger sons of earls
Derek Keppel
Masters of the Household
1863 births
1944 deaths